Louro is a Portuguese surname. Notable people with the surname include:

Evan Louro (born 1996), American soccer player
Fernando Louro (born 1962), Brazilian cyclist
Maria Lucília Estanco Louro (1922–2018), Portuguese political activist
Silvino Louro (born 1959), Portuguese footballer

Portuguese-language surnames